Villar de Samaniego is a village and municipality located in the province of Salamanca, western Spain, part of the autonomous community of Castile and León. It is located 81 kilometres from the provincial capital city of Salamanca and has a population of 119 people.

Geography
The municipality covers an area of 28 km². It lies 745 metres above sea level and the post code is 37218.

References

Municipalities in the Province of Salamanca